"Charged Up" is a song by Canadian rapper Drake. It is the first diss track aimed at American rapper Meek Mill. At OVO Fest 2015, Drake performed this song and "Back to Back" live.

Background
On July 22, 2015, Meek Mill publicly criticized Drake on Twitter after being upset with Drake's non-involvement with the promotion of his album Dreams Worth More Than Money, claiming that he used ghostwriters to write his verse on "R.I.C.O." Following this, Drake released two diss songs within a week, "Charged Up" and "Back to Back", both aimed at Meek Mill. Meek Mill later responded with another diss song about Drake, titled "Wanna Know". Meek Mill later removed his diss to Drake on SoundCloud.

Track listing
Digital download
 "Charged Up" – 3:10

Personnel 
All are credited as songwriters. Adapted from TIDAL.

 Maneesh – production
 40 – production
 Frank Dukes – keyboards
 Drake – vocals

Charts

Commercial performance
"Charged Up" debuted and peaked at number 75 on the Billboard Canadian Hot 100. The song also debuted and peaked at number 78 on the Billboard Hot 100.

Weekly charts

See also
List of notable diss tracks

References

External links
Lyrics of this song at Genius

2015 songs
Drake (musician) songs
Songs written by Drake (musician)
Diss tracks
2015 singles
Song recordings produced by 40 (record producer)
Songs written by 40 (record producer)
Songs written by Frank Dukes
Song recordings produced by Frank Dukes
Freestyle music songs
Cloud rap songs